Lichen sclerosus (LS) is a chronic, inflammatory skin disease of unknown cause which can affect any body part of any person but has a strong preference for the genitals (penis, vulva) and is also known as balanitis xerotica obliterans (BXO) when it affects the penis. Lichen sclerosus is not contagious. There is a well-documented increase of skin cancer risk in LS, potentially improvable with treatment. LS in adult age women is normally incurable, but improvable with treatment, and often gets progressively worse if not treated properly. Most males with mild or intermediate disease restricted to foreskin or glans can be cured by either medical or surgical treatment.

Signs and symptoms

LS can occur without symptoms. White patches on the LS body area, itching, pain, dyspareunia (in genital LS), easier bruising, cracking, tearing and peeling, and hyperkeratosis are common symptoms in both men and women. In women, the condition most commonly occurs on the vulva and around the anus with ivory-white elevations that may be flat and glistening.

In males, the disease may take the form of whitish patches on the foreskin and its narrowing (preputial stenosis), forming an "indurated ring", which can make retraction more difficult or impossible (phimosis). In addition there can be lesions, white patches or reddening on the glans. In contrast to women, anal involvement is less frequent. Meatal stenosis, making it more difficult or even impossible to urinate, may also occur.

On the non-genital skin, the disease may manifest as porcelain-white spots with small visible plugs inside the orifices of hair follicles or sweat glands on the surface. Thinning of the skin may also occur.

Psychological effect
Distress due to the discomfort and pain of lichen sclerosus is normal, as are concerns with self-esteem and sex. Counseling can help.

According to the National Vulvodynia Association, which also supports women with lichen sclerosus, vulvo-vaginal conditions can cause feelings of isolation, hopelessness, low self-image, and much more. Some women are unable to continue working or have sexual relations and may be limited in other physical activities. Depression, anxiety, and even anger are all normal responses to the ongoing pain LS patients experience.

Pathophysiology
Although it is not clear what causes LS, several theories have been postulated. Lichen sclerosus is not contagious; it cannot be caught from another person.

Several risk factors have been proposed, including autoimmune diseases, infections and genetic predisposition. There is evidence that LS can be associated with thyroid disease.

Genetic
Lichen sclerosus may have a genetic component. A high correlation of lichen sclerosus has been reported between twins and between family members.

Autoimmunity
Autoimmunity is a process in which the body fails to recognize itself and therefore attacks its own cells and tissue. Specific antibodies have been found in LS. Furthermore, there seems to be a higher prevalence of other autoimmune diseases such as diabetes mellitus type 1, vitiligo, alopecia areata, and thyroid disease.

Infection
Both bacterial as well as viral pathogens have been implicated in the etiology of LS. A disease that is similar to LS, acrodermatitis chronica atrophicans is caused by the spirochete Borrelia burgdorferi. Viral involvement of HPV and hepatitis C are also suspected.

A link with Lyme disease is shown by the presence of Borrelia burgdorferi in LSA biopsy tissue.

Hormones
Since LS in females is primarily found in women with a low estrogen state (prepubertal and postmenopausal women), hormonal influences were postulated. To date though, very little evidence has been found to support this theory.

Local skin changes
Some findings suggest that LS can be initiated through scarring or radiation, although these findings were sporadic and very uncommon.

Diagnosis

The disease often goes undiagnosed for several years, as it is sometimes not recognized and misdiagnosed as thrush or other problems and not correctly diagnosed until the patient is referred to a specialist when the problem does not clear up.

A biopsy of the affected skin can be done to confirm diagnosis. When a biopsy is done, hyperkeratosis, atrophic epidermis, sclerosis of dermis and lymphocyte activity in dermis are histological findings associated with LS. The biopsies are also checked for signs of dysplasia.

It has been noted that clinical diagnosis of BXO can be "almost unmistakable," though there are other dermatologic conditions such as lichen planus, localized scleroderma, leukoplakia, vitiligo, and the cutaneous rash of Lyme disease can have a similar appearance.

Treatment

Main treatment
There is no definitive cure for LS. Behavior change is part of treatment. The patient should minimize or preferably stop scratching LS-affected skin. Any scratching, stress or damage to the skin can worsen the disease. Scratching has been theorized to increase cancer risks. Furthermore, the patient should wear comfortable clothes and avoid tight clothing, as it is a major factor in the severity of symptoms in some cases.

Topically applied corticosteroids to the LS-affected skin are the first-line treatment for lichen sclerosus in women and men, with strong evidence showing that they are "safe and effective" when appropriately applied, even over long courses of treatment, rarely causing serious adverse effects. They improve or suppress all symptoms for some time, which highly varies across patients, until it is required to use them again. Methylprednisolone aceponate has been used as a safe and effective corticosteroid for mild and moderate cases. For severe cases, it has been theorized that mometasone furoate might be safer and more effective than clobetasol. Recent studies have shown that topical calcineurin inhibitors such as tacrolimus can have an effect similar to corticosteroids, but its effects on cancer risks in LS are not conclusively known. Based on limited evidence, a 2011 Cochrane review concluded that clobetasol propionate, mometasone furoate, and pimecrolimus (calcineurin inhibitor) all are effective therapies in treating genital lichen sclerosus. However, randomized-controlled trials are needed to further identify the optimal potency and regimen of topical corticosteroids and assess the duration of remission and/or the prevention of flares patients experience with these topical therapies.

Continuous usage of appropriate doses of topical corticosteroids is required to ensure symptoms stay relieved over the patient's life time. If continuously used, corticosteroids have been suggested to minimize the risk of cancer in various studies. In a prospective longitudinal cohort study of 507 women throughout 6 years, cancer occurred for 4.7% of patients who were only "partially compliant" with corticosteroid treatment, while it occurred in 0% of cases where they were "fully compliant". In a second study, of 129 patients, cancer occurred in 11% of patients, none of which were fully compliant with corticosteroid treatment. Both these studies however also said that a corticosteroid as powerful as clobetasol is not necessary in most cases. In a prospective study of 83 patients, throughout 20 years, 8 patients developed cancer. 6 already had cancer at presentation and had not had treatment, while the other 2 were not taking corticosteroids often enough. In all three studies, every single cancer case observed occurred in patients who weren't taking corticosteroids as often as the study recommended.

Continuous, abundant usage of emollients topically applied to the LS-affected skin is recommended to improve symptoms. They can supplement but not replace corticosteroid therapy. They can be used much more frequently than corticosteroids due to the extreme rarity of serious adverse effects. Appropriate lubrication should be used every time before and during sex in genital LS in order to avoid pain and worsening the disease. Some oils such as olive oil and coconut oil can be used to accomplish both the emollient and sexual lubrication function.

In males, it has been reported that circumcision can have positive effects, but does not necessarily prevent further flares of the disease and does not protect against the possibility of cancer. Circumcision does not prevent or cure LS; in fact, "balanitis xerotica obliterans" in men was first reported as a condition affecting a set of circumcised men, by Stühmer in 1928.

Other treatments
Carbon dioxide laser treatment is safe and effective, and it improves symptoms over a long time, but it does not lower cancer risks.

Platelet-rich plasma was reported to be effective in one study, producing large improvements in the patients' quality of life, with an average IGA improvement of 2.04 and DLQI improvement of 7.73.

Prognosis
The disease can last for a considerably long time. Occasionally, "spontaneous cure" may ensue, particularly in young girls.

Lichen sclerosus is associated with a higher risk of cancer. Skin that has been scarred as a result of lichen sclerosus is more likely to develop skin cancer. Women with lichen sclerosus may develop vulvar carcinoma. Lichen sclerosus is associated with 3–7% of all cases of vulvar squamous cell carcinoma. In women, it has been reported that 33.6 times higher vulvar cancer risk is associated with LS. A study in men reported that "The reported incidence of penile carcinoma in patients with BXO is 2.6–5.8%".

Epidemiology
There is a bimodal age distribution in the incidence of LS in women. It occurs in females with an average age of diagnosis of 7.6 years in girls and 60 years old in women. The average age of diagnosis in boys is 9–11 years old.

In men, the most common age of incidence is 21–30.

History
In 1875, Weir reported what was possible vulvar or oral LS as "ichthyosis." In 1885, Breisky described kraurosis vulvae. In 1887, Hallopeau described a series of extragenital cases of LS. In 1892, Darier formally described the classic histopathology of LS. In 1900 the concept was formed that scleroderma and LS are closely related, which continues to this day. In 1901, pediatric LS was described. From 1913 to present, the concept that scleroderma is not closely related to LS also was formed. In 1920, Taussig established vulvectomy as the treatment of choice for kraurosis vulvae, a premalignant condition. In 1927, Kyrle defined LS ("white spot disease") as an entity sui generis. In 1928, Stühmer described balanitis xerotica obliterans as a postcircumcision phenomenon. In 1936, retinoids (vitamin A) were used in LS. In 1945, testosterone was used in genital LS. In 1961, the use of corticosteroids started. Jeffcoate presented an argument against vulvectomy for simple LS. In 1971, progesterone was used in LS. Wallace defined clinical factors and the epidemiology of LS. In 1976, Friedrich defined LS as a dystrophic, not an atrophic condition; "et atrophicus" was dropped. The International Society for Study of Vulvar Disease classification system established that "kraurosis" and "leukoplakia" were no longer to be used. In 1980, fluorinated and superpotent steroids were first used in LS. In 1981, studies into HLA serotypes and LS were published. In 1984, etretinate and acetretin were used in LS. In 1987, LS was linked with Borrelia infection.

Lichen sclerosus et atrophicus was first described in 1887 by François Henri Hallopeau. Since not all cases of lichen sclerosus exhibit atrophic tissue, et atrophicus was dropped in 1976 by the International Society for the Study of Vulvovaginal Disease (ISSVD), officially proclaiming the name lichen sclerosus.

See also 
 Lichen planus
 List of cutaneous conditions
 List of cutaneous conditions associated with increased risk of nonmelanoma skin cancer
 List of human leukocyte antigen alleles associated with cutaneous conditions

References

External links 
 NIAMS – Questions and Answers About Lichen Sclerosus
 NIAMS – Fast Facts About Lichen Sclerosus
 dermnetnz.org
 better medicine
 Medscape Reference Author: Jeffrey Meffert, MD; Chief Editor: Dirk M Elston, MD

Medical pictures
 http://www.dermlectures.com/LecturesWMV.cfm?lectureID=88
 https://web.archive.org/web/20070927210529/http://dermis.multimedica.de/dermisroot/de/34088/diagnose.htm
 https://web.archive.org/web/20071008130921/http://dermnetnz.org/immune/ls-imgs.html

Ailments of unknown cause
Lichenoid eruptions